Saint-Bonnet-de-Joux is a commune in the Saône-et-Loire department in the region of Bourgogne-Franche-Comté in central eastern France. In the Charolais natural region of Burgundy.

See also
Communes of the Saône-et-Loire department

References

Communes of Saône-et-Loire